Morpheis comisteon is a moth in the family Cossidae. It was described by William Schaus in 1911. It is found in Costa Rica.

References

Natural History Museum Lepidoptera generic names catalog

Zeuzerinae
Moths described in 1911